Senator Zimmer may refer to:

Dick Zimmer (born 1944), New Jersey State Senate
Russell Zimmer (born 1926), Wyoming State Senate